The 2014 Toyota Owners 400 was a NASCAR Sprint Cup Series stock car race held on April 26, 2014, at Richmond International Raceway in Richmond, Virginia. Contested over 400 laps on the  D-shaped short track, it was the ninth race of the 2014 Sprint Cup Series championship. Joey Logano recorded his fifth career win in this race. Jeff Gordon finished second, while Kyle Busch, Brad Keselowski, and Matt Kenseth rounded out the top five. The top rookies of the race were Kyle Larson (16th), Justin Allgaier (21st), and Austin Dillon (27th).

Previous race
On the final restart of the Bojangles' Southern 500, Dale Earnhardt Jr. got an excellent start to get ahead of Kevin Harvick, but Harvick with four tires passed Dale on two and took the victory at Darlington Raceway. “This is the one race I told Rodney (Childers, crew chief) I wanted to win,” said Harvick. “We were able to put it all together, but this is the Southern 500, this is as big as it gets in NASCAR racing. It feels great. It’s allowed us with the way the points system is to go for wins and not have to worry about the bad weeks too much,” he said. “Really proud for these guys and looking forward to the last 10." “It's a little disappointing to come that close because I know I don't really run that well here and the opportunities to win are going to be very few compared to other tracks,” said Earnhardt Jr. “It hurts a little bit to come that close because we worked so hard to try to win races. Running second is great but nobody is going to really remember that. But we're proud of it.” “Yeah, just very happy to finish there in the top three,” said Johnson. “I thought we had a shot at a win. I think if things stayed green after our last pit stop, we had a good chance at it, good shot at it. I'm happy with (crew chief) Chad's (Knaus) decision to go with two, and there were enough cars that took two that it gave us a little bit of a cushion, maybe enough of a cushion to make it four or five laps there.”

Report

Background

The turns are banked at fourteen degrees. The front stretch is banked at eight degrees and the back stretch is banked at two degrees. Richmond can seat 97,912 people. Kevin Harvick was the defending race winner after winning the event in 2013.

During the time between Darlington and Richmond, Swan Racing announced, on April 17, 2014, that they were closing shop and reevaluating their financial situation and put the team's prospects of competing at Richmond in doubt. "The team has been unable to secure the kind of sponsorship required to effectively operate the team," the team said in a statement. "As a result, the team management is exploring every available option. We hope to be in a position to provide a detailed update in the near future."

On April 23, Swan Racing sold both of its teams to different shops. Anthony Marlowe merged his ownership of the number 26 car with BK Racing and the number 30 car was sold to Xxxtreme Motorsports. Cole Whitt stayed in the number 26 car for Richmond, but Parker Kligerman was not in the number 30 car and was without a ride for the foreseeable future. J. J. Yeley took his place. "I am very relieved to know that the Nos. 26 and 30 teams will be in good hands, and will continue to compete for the remainder of the 2014 NASCAR Sprint Cup Series season," Davis said in a statement. "Most importantly, most of the team members have the opportunity to continue their employment in the sport and to support their families. This was critically important to me."

Entry list
The entry list for the Toyota Owners 400 was released on Thursday, April 24, 2014 at 4:16 p.m. Eastern time. Forty-five drivers were entered for the race.

Practice

First practice

Final practice

Qualifying
Qualifying was rained out so the starting lineup was set by first practice results. Kyle Larson earned his first career pole as a result. “We came here and tested last year for Goodyear and had a good baseline and was pretty confident with our qualifying trim without getting used to the car yet,’’ Larson said. “Then we switched over to race trim and we were good in that, so excited about that.’’ Dave Blaney and Michael McDowell failed to qualify for the race.

Starting lineup

Race

Kyle Larson led the field to the green at 7:14 p.m., but the field didn't make it to turn 1 before the caution flew on the first lap when Larson drifted down in front of Clint Bowyer before he cleared him and got turned around. To make matters worse, Larson caught the tail end of the field exiting pit road and hit the rear of Landon Cassill but only suffered a minor denting in of the faux grill. While Richmond International Raceway, like Bristol Motor Speedway and Martinsville Speedway, isn't very aero-sensitive, the damage was close enough to the actual grill to cause concern. Brad Keselowski took over the lead as a result.

The race restarted on lap eight and the field made it through the lap with no accident.

Kevin Harvick took the lead on lap 32.

A scheduled competition caution (second of the race) flew on lap 41 because of overnight downpours. Travis Kvapil stayed out to lead a lap before making his stop the next lap and handing the lead back to Harvick.

The race restarted on lap 47.

Keselowski retook the lead on lap 56.

Debris in turn 4 brought out the third caution on lap 99. Landon Cassill stayed out to lead a lap before pitting. Jeff Gordon took over the lead.

The race restarted on lap 107.

Cole Whitt had a right-front tire failure on lap 157 and chunks of burning rubber from his car scattered onto the racing surface past the exit of pit road. This brought out the fourth caution of the race on lap 161. Clint Bowyer had a similar tire failure that caught fire and melted the right-front fender of the car. Gordon and Brad Keselowski swapped the lead with the former being pitted behind the start/finish line. He beat Brad off to resume leading the field.

The race restarted on lap 171.

Brad Keselowski took back the lead on lap 173.

Jeff Gordon reclaimed the top spot on lap 209.

The fifth caution of the race flew on lap 226 after Reed Sorenson cut down his right-front tire and missed the entrance to pit road. Gordon swapped the lead on pit road with Joey Logano, but came out the leader.

The race restarted on lap 239.

Joey Logano took back the lead on lap 243.

Jeff Gordon took back the lead on lap 252.

The sixth caution of the race flew on lap 296 after Ricky Stenhouse Jr. had a right-front tire failure that caught fire after hitting the wall in turn 4. Gordon swapped the lead on pit road with his teammate Dale Earnhardt Jr., but this time, Jeff Gordon got beat off pit road.

The race restarted with 96 laps to go.

Joey Logano retook the lead with 95 laps to go.

As is the case with short track races, drivers start becoming agitated and more aggressive in the closing stages of the race. Marcos Ambrose found himself being hit from behind on multiple occasions.

Jeff Gordon took back the lead with 63 laps to go.

Matt Kenseth took the lead with 39 laps to go.

Debris in turn 3 brought out the seventh caution of the race with 33 laps to go.

The race restarted with 24 laps to go and the caution flew for the eighth time after Kyle Busch turned into Justin Allgaier and then into his teammate Denny Hamlin to send him spinning in turn 3.

The race restarted with 18 laps to go and Joey Logano got a terrible restart that caused him to hold up the inside line.

The ninth caution of the race flew with 16 laps to go after J. J. Yeley blew his engine in turn 1.

The race restarted with nine laps to go. Matt Kenseth couldn't stave off the two car challenge for the lead with Jeff Gordon and Brad Keselowski. Gordon got into the rear of Keselowski and this allowed Joey Logano to get back to the lead. He built an insurmountable lead with three laps to go over Jeff Gordon to score the victory. "It feels great,” said Logano. “I want to start winning some races in the Chase now. These cars right now are so good and (Team) Penske is doing such a great job with these cars right now. I am just the lucky guy that gets to drive these things." "I had a blast tonight," said Gordon, who remained on top of the point standings. "Great short-track racing here at Richmond. And to have a race car like that to drive from 25th up to the front was so much fun."

Post-race

Brad Keselowski was not happy with Matt Kenseth and showed his displeasure during the cool down lap when he brake-checked Matt. Dale Earnhardt Jr. tried to rundown Keselowski after he ran into Kenseth because of Brad, but was stopped by an official and directed to the garage area while Brad continued to the top five impound area on pit road. “Yeah it was a wild finish,” said Keselowski, who confronted Kenseth on pit road after the race. “It just came down to really a four way battle between the 2 (Keselowski), the 20 (Kenseth), the 24 (Gordon) and 22 (Logano) and we had a great car for the short runs and we got up there challenging for the lead. The 20 car ran me off the race track so I made sure to give him a bump and that was what Joey needed to win the race. I had a shot at winning the race and he ran me off the track. It was just a mind-boggling move to me. ... I thought it was uncalled for."

The tempers didn't end on pit road. In the garage area, Casey Mears had got in a scuffle with Marcos Ambrose which ended with the latter appearing to punch the former in the face; Ambrose was fined $25,000 and Mears $15,000 (and put into probation until May 28) for the fight.

Race results

Race statistics
 Lead changes: 20 among different drivers
 Cautions/Laps: 9 for 66
 Red flags: 0
 Time of race: 3 hours, 12 minutes and 47 seconds
 Average speed:

Media

Television

Radio

Standings after the race

Drivers' Championship standings

Manufacturers' Championship standings

Note: Only the first sixteen positions are included for the driver standings.

References

Toyota Owners 400
Toyota Owners 400
NASCAR races at Richmond Raceway
Toyota Owners 400